The Australian Space Research Institute (ASRI) was formed 1991 with the merger of the AUSROC Launch Vehicle Development Group at Monash University, Melbourne and the Australian Space Engineering Research Association (ASERA).

The institute is a non-profit organisation run entirely by volunteers. Most of the work at ASRI is done in collaboration with Australian universities such as the Royal Melbourne Institute of Technology, Queensland University of Technology and the University of Technology, Sydney. , ASRI is developing a vision for the future of Australia's space community, including industry. ASRI does not receive any direct government funding.

The ASRI was created to provide opportunities for space-related industry and technology development for the Australian technical community.

History of space activities in Australia
During the heyday of rocketry research in the 1960s Australia was the seventh nation  to launch a satellite, WRESAT, into orbit, and the third from its own soil.

The joint British-Australian Blue Streak program to develop Intercontinental ballistic missiles ended in the late 1960s.

Around the same time the European Launcher Development Organisation (ELDO) was established to develop a European satellite launch vehicle. Woomera, Australia, was chosen as the launch site for the test vehicles. Australia was granted status as the only non-European member of ELDO (one of the precursors to the European Space Agency) in return for providing the launch facilities. A series of successful launches was conducted from 1964 to 1970 with the aim of reaching orbit and eventually orbiting an operational satellite. The final launch attempt of ELDO's Europa 1 launch vehicle took place at Woomera on 12 June 1970 however the satellite failed to reach orbit. No successful satellite launch was ever achieved by the ELDO and European satellite launch activities then shifted to the French site at Kourou, in French Guiana, which is now home to Ariane launchers.

Since then Australian space-related activities have been virtually nonexistent. The goal of the ASRI is to re-establish Australia as a significant player in the global space industry.

Sounding Rockets
The Small Sounding Rocket Program (SSRP), initiated in the mid-1990s, provides Australian educational institutions with a low cost payload launch service. The service has expanded to include individuals, companies, foreign universities and non-commercial organisations seeking assistance to launch their own vehicles.

Launches are conducted twice a year from Woomera, South Australia. Two types of rockets are used:
Sighter, a solid fuel rocket capable of launching a 3 kg payload to an altitude of 5.9 km at speeds over Mach 1, and
Zuni, a solid fuel rocket capable of launching a heavier payload to an altitude of approximately 7 km, and reaching speeds of Mach 2.5.

Launch vehicle development
The aim of the AUSROC program is to develop a micro-satellite launch vehicle capable of being scaled up for use in heavier launch vehicles.

AUSROC I
The AUSROC I program commenced in 1988 with a group of undergraduate students in Mechanical Engineering at Monash University, who designed and built AUSROC I. It was successfully launched on 9 February 1989. The flight lasted one minute, reaching 3 km in altitude and 161 m/s. AUSROC I was a liquid-fueled rocket based on a modified Pacific Rocket Society design.

AUSROC II
AUSROC II was a larger pressure fed kerosene-oxygen bipropellant rocket that was developed in the 1990s. It was designed to reach an altitude of 10 km. The first attempt at launching an AUSROC II suffered a spectacular failure on the launch pad in 1992. The subsequent rocket, named AUSROC II-2 was successfully launched in 1995 from Woomera, although it did not reach its target apogee due to pressurisation problems with the LOX tank.

AUSROC 2.5

AUSROC 2.5  was designed to provide an intermediate step between the AUSROC II and III programs. It uses the same size engine as the AUSROC III but with simpler and easier to implement cooling methods. The primary objective was to deliver a 10 kg payload to an altitude of 20 km and recover the rocket intact.

AUSROC 2.5 was the principal subject of current developments efforts. It was projected to launch in late 2007. Prior to that, a key milestone was the ground testing of the propulsion subsystem.

The project is currently seeking volunteers to assist with manufacturing, integration and testing.

AUSROC III
AUSROC III was designed to launch a payload of 150 kg to an altitude of 500 km. It was a sounding rocket that will incorporate active guidance for "live" steering, and a steerable parachute recovery system.

AUSROC IV
AUSROC IV was the final stage of the AUSROC program and consisted of five AUSROC IIIs, four for the first stage and one for the second stage. It was intended to place a small satellite (up to 35 kg) into a Low Earth Orbit.

AUSROC Nano
AUSROC Nano is a three-stage, liquid-liquid-solid orbital launch vehicle, designed to launch a payload of 10 kg into low Earth orbit at an altitude of 300 km. It was designed to incorporate a rapid setup and launch capability that would provide the payload with the option of polar or equatorial orbit profiles.

Zuni rockets
The Australian Government has donated its Zuni rockets to the ASRI for use for student experiments which are launched from the Woomera launching range. Every year, a few Zunis are launched there.

ASRI has also designed and constructed custom nosecones and payload recovery mechanisms for the Zuni. With a payload of 20 kg, the Zuni has an approximate range of 5.9 km, which it attains in about 40 seconds, experiencing 55 g and 491 m/s (Mach 1.4) during the flight.

Satellites 
The discontinued Australis Microsatellite program aimed to develop a low-cost, autonomous satellite that could be used for a variety of applications such as low Earth orbit communications, remote sensing and small scale science experiments.

JAESAT (Joint Australian Engineering Satellite) is a collaboration between ASRI, the Cooperative Research Centre for Satellite Systems, the Queensland University of Technology and Ukrainian Youth Aerospace Association, Suzirya, that began in 1997. The project was put on hold in 2000 when CRCSS withdrew funds due to cost and schedule over-runs with a joint American-Australian venture, FedSat.

Hypersonics
The Centre for Hypersonics at the University of Queensland (UQ) performs extensive research into developing the science behind scramjet propulsion.

The hypersonics project, currently on hold is a joint effort between ASRI and UQ to develop a free-flight scramjet engine.

See also

Commonwealth Scientific and Industrial Research Organisation
National Space Program
Australian Space Agency

References

External links
ASRI website
International project JAESAT Suzirya
Australia in Space Aerospaceguide.net
Cooperative Research Centre for Satellite Systems

Space organizations
Space agencies
Research institutes in Australia
Non-profit organisations based in Queensland
Space programme of Australia